Thankful is the debut studio album by American singer Kelly Clarkson, released in the United States by RCA Records on April 15, 2003. "Miss Independent" was its first single, followed by "Low" and "The Trouble with Love Is". Initially, the album had been scheduled to be released in November 2002, however, Clarkson's demanding schedule and difficulty finding tracks that suited her taste and image forced the album to be delayed several times. By the time the album was released, over six months had elapsed since "A Moment Like This" had reached number one.

The album debuted at number one on the US Billboard 200 selling 297,000 copies. "Miss Independent" went on to be a top ten hit in the United States. Thankful has sold 2,800,000 copies in the United States, receiving a 2× platinum certification from the Recording Industry Association of America (RIAA). In Canada, Thankful was certified platinum for 100,000 copies shipped by the Canadian Recording Industry Association (CRIA).

Background
Two songs originally on the album, "Trace of Gold" and "Today for Me", written by Stephanie Saraco, were replaced just before the album release by "Anytime" and "A Moment Like This". Early released versions of the CD still show the original tracks on players that read the data from the CD itself (such as Windows Media Player). The two songs have yet to be heard by the general public. Copies of Thankful sold during its first year of release contained a computer program that could be loaded, and used with the internet for artist updates and music videos. The program ceased to function when her official RCA website was launched. Thankful included four cover tracks, "(You Make Me Feel Like) A Natural Woman" originally by Aretha Franklin, "Some Kind of Miracle" originally sung by Puff Johnson, "Anytime" by Mary Griffin and "Just Missed the Train" by Trine Rein.  "Just Missed the Train" was previously covered by Danielle Brisebois and Carly Smithson (then Carly Hennessy), who worked on much of her album with Brisebois.

Critical reception

Critical response for Thankful was generally positive. On Metacritic, a website that compiles various reviews, the album received a score of 62, indicating generally favorable reviews. Entertainment Weekly noted that "Clarkson glides through octaves with the masterful control of someone who's been doing this for decades". Rolling Stone gave the album three out of five stars, praising Clarkson's talent and vocal abilities, while criticizing the album for feeling manufactured. They note that "[her] high notes are sweet and pillowy, her growl is bone-shaking and sexy, and her midrange is amazingly confident for a pop posy whose career is tied for eternity to the whims of her American Idol overlords".

On the other hand, Q gave the album a very negative review, stating that the album "has her trilling like Mariah Carey on fluffy R&B tunes."

Commercial performance
Release of the album was preceded by the single "Miss Independent", which became a top 10 Billboard Hot 100 hit and a number one top 40 smash. In thanks to the success of the single, as well as buzz from her American Idol win (Clarkson also appeared several times on the show's second season to promote Thankful), the album sold well in the United States. It managed to debut at number one on the Billboard 200 with 297,000 copies sold. The album sold over 1 million copies in six weeks. According to Nielsen SoundScan, Thankful has sold 2,800,000 copies to date in the US.
Further single releases "Low" and "The Trouble with Love Is" did not replicate the success of the first single. "Just Missed the Train" and "You Thought Wrong" had been planned for possible single releases, but after the underperformance of "Low" and "The Trouble with Love Is", they were canceled.

Track listing

Personnel

Musicians 
 Kelly Clarkson – lead vocals, backing vocals (2, 4, 5, 11)
 Carl Sturken – keyboards (1, 5), drum programming (1, 5), guitars (5)
 Rhett Lawrence – programming (2, 4), guitars (2), scratching (2), arrangements (2, 4)
 Clif Magness – keyboards (3, 6), acoustic piano (3, 6), programming (3, 6), acoustic guitar (3, 6), electric guitars (3, 6), bass (3, 6), arrangements (3, 6)
 Kenneth Crouch – organ (4)
 Matthew Wilder – acoustic piano (7), programming (7), guitars (7)
 Babyface – instruments (8, 9) 
 Harvey Mason Jr. – instruments (8, 9)
 Louis Biancaniello – keyboards (10), programming (10), arrangements (10)
 Steve Mac – keyboards (11)
 Jeremy Ruzumna – organ (11)
 Doug Emery – keyboards (12), programming (12), arrangements (12)
 Jim Gasior – acoustic piano (12)
 Olle Romo – guitars (2)
 Tim Pierce – guitars (4)
 James Harrah – guitars (7)
 Corky James – guitars (8)
 Chris Camozzi – guitars (10)
 Pathik Desai – guitars (11)
 Paul Gendler – guitars (11)
 Fridrik Karlsson – guitars (11)
 Dan Warner – guitars (12)
 Tommy Sims – bass (4)
 Mike Elizondo – bass (7)
 Reggie Hamilton – bass (8, 9)
 Steve Pearce – bass (11)
 Randy Jackson – bass (12)
 Steve Ferrera – drums (1, 2, 4, 11), percussion (11)
 Josh Freese – drums (3)
 Abe Laboriel Jr. – drums (7)
 Teddy Campbell – drums (8)
 Lee Levin – drums (12)
 Wayne Rodrigues – scratching (2)
 Dave Arch – string arrangements (11)
 Cindy Mizelle – backing vocals (1)
 Evan Rogers – backing vocals (1)
 Suzie Benson – backing vocals (2)
 Danielle Brisebois – backing vocals (3, 6)
 Sherree Ford – backing vocals (4)
 Sharlotte Gibson – backing vocals (4)
 Lorenza Stopponi – backing vocals (5)
 Rebekah Jordan – backing vocals (7)
 Tamyra Gray – harmony vocals (8)
 Mary Griffin – backing vocals (10)
 Conesha Owens – backing vocals (10)
 Sam Watters – backing vocals (10), arrangements (10)
 Debra Byrd – backing vocals (11)
 Leslie Smith – backing vocals (11)
 Gina Taylor – backing vocals (11)
 Chris Willis – backing vocals (12), BGV arrangements (12)
 Aisha Wright – backing vocals (12)
 Betty Wright – backing vocals (12)
 Jeanette Wright – backing vocals (12)

Strings (Tracks 1 & 5)
 Larry Gold – arrangements and conductor
 James Cooper III – cello (1, 5)
 Jennie Lorenzo – cello (1)
 Alexandra Leem – viola (1)
 Peter Nocella – viola (1)
 Daniela Pierson – viola (5)
 David Yang – viola (5)
 Charlene Kwas – violin (1)
 Emma Kummrow – violin (1, 5)
 Charles Parker Jr. – violin (1)
 Igor Szwec – violin (1, 5)
 Gregory Teperman – violin (1)
 Ghislaine Fleischmann – violin (5)
 Gloria Justen – violin (5)

Strings and French horn on "Before Your Love"
 David Campbell – arrangements and conductor 
 Suzie Katayama – orchestra manager
 Bette Ross-Blumer – musical assistance
 Joel Derouin – concertmaster
 Richard Todd – French horn
 Larry Corbett and Dan Smith – cello
 Bob Becker and Darrin McCann – viola
 Charlie Bisharat, Bruce Dukov, Berj Garabedian, Peter Kent, Michele Richards, John Wittenberg and Ken Yerke – violin

Production 
 Clive Davis – executive producer
 Andrea Derby – production coordinator (1, 5)
 Jolie Levine-Aller – production coordinator (8, 9)
 Brian Coleman – production manager (12)
 Frank Harkins – art direction
 Brett Kilroe – art direction
 Tony Duran – photography

Technical
 J.D. Andrew – engineer (1)
 Rich Balmer – engineer (1)
 Al Hemberger – engineer (1, 5)
 Rhett Lawrence – Pro Tools engineer (2, 4), mixing (2)
 Steve McMillan – Pro Tools engineer (2, 4), mixing (2)
 Olle Romo – Pro Tools engineer (2, 4)
 Jim Watts – Pro Tools engineer (2, 4)
 Andy Zulla – Pro Tools engineer (2, 4), engineer (11), mixing (11), additional recording (12)
 Clif Magness – engineer (3, 6)
 Csaba Petocz – engineer (7)
 Paul Boutin – recording (8, 9)
 Dave Russell – recording (8, 9), mixing (8, 9)
 Louis Biancaniello – engineer (10), mixing (10)
 Sean Tallman – engineer (10)
 Sam Watters – engineer (10)
 Matt Howe – engineer (11)
 Chris Laws – engineer (11)
 Robin Sellars – engineer (11)
 Carlos Alvarez – recording (12), mixing (12)
 Steve Churchyard – recording (12)
 Jules Gondar – recording (12)
 Craig Lozowick – recording (12)
 Dan Bucchi – assistant engineer (1)
 John Ishizeki – assistant engineer (1)
 Kevin Harp – assistant engineer (3, 6)
 Cesar Ramirez – assistant engineer (3, 6)
 Quentin Dunn – second engineer (7)
 Kevin Mahoney – assistant engineer (8, 9)
 Joel Sheppard – assistant engineer (8, 9)
 Daniel Pursey – assistant engineer (11)
 Cosbie Cates – second engineer (12)
 Jimmy Hoyson – second engineer (12)
 Jeff Kanan – second engineer (12)
 Greg London – second engineer (12)
 Marcelo Marulanda – second engineer (12)
 Doug Emery – additional recording (12)
 Conrad Golding – additional recording (12), second engineer (12)
 Dino Hermann – additional recording (12)
 Lee Levin – additional recording (12)
 Jeff Chestek – string engineer (1, 5)
 Gordon Goss – assistant string engineer (1)
 Vincent Dilorenzo – assistant string engineer (5)
 Tony Maserati – mixing (1, 4, 5)
 Dave Pensado – mixing (2)
 Bob Clearmountain – mixing (3, 6)
 Mike Shipley – mixing (7) 
 Steve Ferrera – mixing (11)
 Brendan Kuntz – mix assistant (1)
 Matt Snedecor – mix assistant (1, 5)
 Jim Briggs – mix assistant (5)
 Pat Woodward – mix assistant (5)
 Dabling Harward – vocal editing (8, 9)
 Stephen Marcussen – mastering

Charts and certifications

Weekly charts

Year-end charts

Certifications

Release history

References

2003 debut albums
Albums produced by Babyface (musician)
Albums produced by Carl Sturken and Evan Rogers
Albums produced by Desmond Child
Albums produced by Matthew Wilder
Albums produced by Sam Watters
Albums produced by the Underdogs (production team)
Albums with cover art by Tony Duran
Kelly Clarkson albums
RCA Records albums
19 Recordings albums
Contemporary R&B albums by American artists